Jean-Michel Antoine Aulas (born 22 March 1949) is a French businessman. He is the founder and CEO of Cegid (Compagnie Européenne de Gestion par l'Informatique Décentralisée) and serves as the owner and president of French football club Olympique Lyonnais which he has owned since 1987. Since January 2020, Aulas is also the chairman of OL Reign.

Aulas was the last president of the prestigious G-14 until it disbanded in January 2008 and also currently serves on the board of European Club Association for his club. In 2018, his net worth was estimated at €600 million.

Olympique Lyonnais
On 15 June 1987, Aulas took control of Olympique Lyonnais and invested in the club with the objective of turning Lyon into an established Ligue 1 side. His ambitious plan, titled OL – Europe, was designed to develop the club on the European level and back into the first division within a time-frame of no more than four years. After ridding the club of its debt, Aulas restructured the club's management and reorganized the finances and, in a span of two decades, transformed the club from a second division team into one of the richest football clubs in the world. Under Aulas's leadership, Lyon won their first ever Ligue 1 championship in 2002 and promptly started a then national-record streak of seven successive titles. Lyon have also won one Coupe de France and Coupe de la Ligue title each, as well as a record six Trophée des Champions titles. The club have appeared in the UEFA Champions League eleven times under Aulas, reaching the semi-finals of the competition twice, in the 2009-10 and 2019-20 seasons.

After establishing Lyon as a contender in French football, Aulas adopted a strategy which allowed the club to acquire many of the top players of other clubs in Ligue 1. After excelling at the club, the chairman would then sell the players for exorbitant fees to clubs abroad. His complex style of negotiating has led to the successful transfers of many former Lyon players such as Michael Essien, Mahamadou Diarra, Karim Benzema, Florent Malouda, Eric Abidal, and Tiago Mendes with all the players departing the club for transfer fees as low as €15 million (Tiago) and as high as €38 million (Essien). On the negative side, Aulas has been lambasted for, according to critics, running the club as if it were a business. The club currently operates on the European Stock Exchange under the name OL Groupe, initialed OLG.

In April 2008, business magazine Forbes ranked Lyon as the thirteenth most valuable football team in the world. The magazine valued the club at $408 million (€368 m), excluding debt. On 12 February 2009, accountants Deloitte released their annual Deloitte Football Money League. In the report, Lyon were rated in the twelfth spot, reportedly bringing in an annual revenue of €155.7 million for the 2007–08 season, which ranks among the world's best football clubs in terms of revenue.

Honours
Orders
Chevalier of the Ordre national du Mérite: 1986
Chevalier of the Légion d'honneur: 2006
Officier of the Ordre national du Mérite: 2012
Officier of the Légion d'honneur: 2016

References

External links

CEGID Press release

1949 births
Living people
People from L'Arbresle
People from Rhône (department)
French football chairmen and investors
OL Reign owners
Knights of the Ordre national du Mérite
Chevaliers of the Légion d'honneur
Officers of the Ordre national du Mérite
Officiers of the Légion d'honneur